The 1988 Austrian motorcycle Grand Prix was the seventh round of the 1988 Grand Prix motorcycle racing season. It took place on the weekend of 10–12 June 1988 at the Salzburgring.

500 cc race report
Christian Sarron on pole, then Eddie Lawson, Niall Mackenzie, Kevin Schwantz and Wayne Gardner.

Gardner got the first turn from Lawson, Rainey, Ron Haslam, Schwantz, et al.

Didier De Radiguès moved up to 4th and the field started to get strung out. Schwantz gave Ron Haslam a little bump as he passed and Sarron crashed out.

Lawson and Gardner swapped the lead, allowing Rainey and De Radiguès to close.

De Radiguès put pressure on Lawson his teammate in 2nd, and Rainey seemed to be dropping away.

Lawson and Gardner drop De Radiguès.

Gardner crashes out of 2nd spot.

500cc classification

References

Austrian motorcycle Grand Prix
Austrian
Motorcycle Grand Prix